Nebivolol/valsartan, sold under the brand name Byvalson among others, is a medication used to treat hypertension.

It is available as a generic medication.

References

Further reading

External links 
 

Antihypertensive agents
Combination drugs
Angiotensin II receptor antagonists